Reevesdale is an unincorporated community and coal town in Schuylkill County, Pennsylvania, United States, 2.6 miles south of Tamaqua.

References

Unincorporated communities in Schuylkill County, Pennsylvania
Coal towns in Pennsylvania
Unincorporated communities in Pennsylvania